Norbert Reithofer (born 29 May 1956 in Penzberg, West Germany) is a German businessman and former chairman of the board of management (CEO) of BMW. He currently serves as chairman of the supervisory board.

Early life and education 
After finishing his Fachabitur, Reithofer graduated in mechanical engineering at the Munich University of Applied Sciences in Munich. He then moved on to the Technical University Munich to study Engineering and Business Administration. After graduation, he became Research Assistant at the university at the Institute for Machine Tools and Business Administration of Joachim Milberg, under whom he gained his Doctorate.

Career 
In 1987, Reithofer joined BMW as head of maintenance planning. From 1991 to 1994 he was Director of the Body in White Production Division. From 1994 to 1997 Reithofer then became Technical Director of BMW South Africa. From 1997 to 2000, Reithofer was President BMW Manufacturing Corporation (USA), based in Spartanburg, South Carolina.

In March 2000, Reithofer returned to Munich to join the BMW Board of Management, responsible for production. In 2002, Reithofer and Development Chief Burkhard Goeschel halved the standard BMW time it took to reach full production of the new generation E90 3 Series, from six months to three.
On 1 September 2006 he succeeded Helmut Panke as chairman of the board and CEO of BMW.

Reithofer stepped down early in May 2015 and was replaced by Harald Krüger; instead, he moved to the non-executive role of chairman of the supervisory board. At the time, critics held the move would go against general corporate governance practice as there was no cooling-off period between the two roles.

Other activities

Corporate boards
 Siemens, Member of the supervisory board (since 2015)
 Henkel, Member of the Shareholders‘ Committee (since 2011)
 Allianz, Member of Joint Advisory Council (since 2007)

Non-profit organizations
 Eberhard von Kuenheim Foundation, Member of the Board of Trustees
 Max Planck Society, Member of the Senate

Awards and honours 
 2005: Grand Decoration of Honour in Gold (Grosses Goldenes Ehrenzeichen) for Services to the Republic of Austria (2005)
 2010: Bayerischen Verdienstorden
 2012 Chevaliers of the Légion d'honneur

References

External links

Interview with Autoweek on gaining CEO's position

1956 births
Living people
Technical University of Munich alumni
German chief executives
Chief executives in the automobile industry
BMW people
Directors of BMW

Chevaliers of the Légion d'honneur
Recipients of the Grand Decoration for Services to the Republic of Austria